Huget is a surname. Huget is one of the names carried to England in the great wave of migration from Normandy following the Norman Conquest in 1066. It is based on the Norman given name Hugh.

Notable people with the surname include:

 Bob Huget (1947–2022), Canadian politician
 Virginia Huget (1899–1991), American comic strip artist and writer
 Wolfgang Huget (born 1977), German golfer
 Yoann Huget (born 1987), French rugby union player

See also
Puget (surname)